Deepa Dasmunsi is an Indian politician. She served as the member of parliament for Raiganj in the 15th Lok Sabha. She was the Minister of State for Urban Development from October 2012 until May 2014. She was the wife of Indian National Congress politician Priya Ranjan Dasmunsi, until his death in 2017.

Early life
Dasmunsi was born on 15 July 1960 in Kolkata, West Bengal to Benoy Ghosh and Durga Ghosh. She was educated at the Rabindra Bharati University in Kolkata and earned an M.A. in dramatics.  

She married Priya Ranjan Dasmunsi on 15 April 1994 and has a son.

Positions held
1. 2006-2009 member, West Bengal Legislative Assembly for Goalpokhar

2. 2009-2014 elected to 15th Lok Sabha from Raiganj

3. 31 August 2009	Member, Parliamentary Committee on Personnel, Public Grievances, Law and Justice

4. 28 October 2012, Union Minister of State, Urban Development

Accomplishments

Stage performer since 1984, television artist, costume designer, art director (T.V. serial and short films)

Sports and clubs

President, Delhi Women Football

Other information

Gold medalist at the post-graduation level and won many awards in theatre.

Education and career
Dasmunsi was educated at Rabindra Bharati University and is a post- graduate in dramatics. She was a gold medallist at the post-graduation level.

She was elected to the West Bengal state assembly in 2006 from the Goalpokhar.
In 2009, she was elected to the 15th Lok Sabha and was a member on the Committee on Personnel, Public Grievances, Law and Justice. She was the Union Minister of State, Urban Development.

She has worked for the homeless street children, disabled children and tribal people.

Interests
Dasmunsi enjoys reading books, gardening, cooking and listening to classical music as her pastime. She has widely travelled across the world and has also been the President of the Delhi Women Football association.

References

Living people
Indian National Congress politicians from West Bengal
India MPs 2009–2014
Rabindra Bharati University alumni
1960 births
Lok Sabha members from West Bengal
People from Uttar Dinajpur district
United Progressive Alliance candidates in the 2014 Indian general election
Women in West Bengal politics
21st-century Indian women politicians
21st-century Indian politicians
Union ministers of state of India
Women union ministers of state of India
Bengali Hindus